The prix Françoise Sagan is a French literary award established in 2010 by , the son of Françoise Sagan.

The Prize 
Awarded at the beginning of June, the Prix Françoise Sagan rewards "an author never yet rewarded, not even selected in recent months. It distinguishes a work in French and is meant to be innovative and focused on a work in progress "thus privileging" a revelation to a talent already confirmed." The selection of the titles in competition is established by the jurors, each proposing one or Two books that can compete.

Jurys 
The jury of the prize, chaired by Denis Westhoff for the first edition, is composed in a moving way according to the years. In addition, the winner automatically joins the jury of the following year and becomes its president.
 2010: Patrick Besson, Michel Déon, Jérôme Garcin,  Annick Geille, François Gibault, Olivia de Lamberterie, Justine Lévy, Françoise-Marie Santucci, Delphine de Vigan, Florian Zeller and Denis Westhoff (with Frédéric Mitterrand, ministre de la Culture et de la Communication, as member of honour).
 2011: Adélaïde de Clermont-Tonnerre (laureate 2010), Guillaume Durand, Jean-Louis Ezine, Olivia de Lamberterie, Jean-Claude Lamy, Macha Makeieff, Patrick Poivre d'Arvor, Yves Simon, Delphine de Vigan, Caroline Wassermann and Denis Westhoff.
 2012: François Angelier, Arnaud Cathrine, Fabienne Berthaud (laureate 2011), Adélaïde de Clermont-Tonnerre, Kathleen Evin, Xavier Houssin, Olivia de Lamberterie, Philippe Lefait, Véronique Ovaldé, Delphine Peras and Denis Westhoff.
 2013: Alexandre Fillon, David Foenkinos, Célia Houdart (laureate 2012), Olivier Mony, Anne Plantagenet, Colombe Schneck, Amanda Sthers, Augustin Trapenard.
2014:
 permanent members: Adélaïde de Clermont-Tonnerre, Olivia de Lamberterie, Denis Westhoff
 Jury 2014: Annabelle Mouloudji, Bernard Lehut, Hélène Gaultier, Olivier Bouillère (laureate 2013), Philippe Delaroche, Simonetta Greggio, Éric Naulleau, Arielle Dombasle, Marianne Payot
 2015:
 permanent members: Adélaïde de Clermont-Tonnerre, Olivia de Lamberterie, Denis Westhoff
 Jury 2015: Virginie Carton, Blandine de Caunes, Céline Hromadova, Stéphanie des Horts, Valérie Gans, Julia Kerninon (laureate 2014), Patricia Martin, Karine Tuil, Frédéric Brun, Benoît Graffin, Frank Maubert.
 2016:
 permanent members: Adélaïde de Clermont-Tonnerre, Olivia de Lamberterie, Denis Westhoff
 Jury 2016: Vincent Almendros (laureate 2015), Danielle Cillien-Sabatier, Loïc Ducroquet, Émilie Frèche, Mathieu Garrigou-Lagrange, Arnaud Le Guern, Louise Mailloux, Valérie Mirarchi

Laureates 
 2010: Fourrure by Adélaïde de Clermont-Tonnerre (Stock)
 2011: Un jardin sur le ventre by Fabienne Berthaud (JBZ et Cie)
 2012: Carrare by Célia Houdart
 2013: Le Poivre by Olivier Bouillère (P.O.L)
 2014: Buvard by Julia Kerninon
 2015: Un été by Vincent Almendros (Les Éditions de Minuit)
 2016: Un beau début by Éric Laurrent (Les Éditions de Minuit)
 2017: Fils du feu by Guy Boley (Grasset)
 2018: Fugitive parce que reine by Violaine Huisman (Gallimard)
 2019: Le sort tomba sur le plus jeune by Sophie Blandinières (Flammarion)
 2020: La dissonante by Clément Rossi (Gallimard)

External links 
 Official site of the Prix Françoise Sagan

French literary awards
Awards established in 2010
2010 establishments in France